Kulpin (Serbian Cyrillic: Кулпин;) is a village in Serbia. It is situated in the Bački Petrovac municipality, in the South Bačka District, Vojvodina province. According to the 2002 census, the population of the village numbering 2,976 people, of whom 2,116 are ethnic Slovaks.

Historical population
1961: 3,742
1971: 3,312
1981: 3,226
1991: 3,203
2002: 2,976

Notable people
 Bogić Vučković
 Georgije Branković
 Stefan Stratimirović

See also
List of places in Serbia
List of cities, towns and villages in Vojvodina

References
Slobodan Ćurčić, Broj stanovnika Vojvodine, Novi Sad, 1996.

External links
 Kulpin web page
 About Kulpin 
 Museum Exhibitions in Dundjerski Palace  

Places in Bačka
Slovak communities in Serbia
Bački Petrovac